Bairat Temple is a freestanding Buddhist temple, a Chaityagriha, located about a mile southwest of the city Viratnagar, Rajasthan, India, on a hill locally called "Bijak-ki-Pahari" ("Hill of the Inscription"). The temple is of a circular type, formed of a central stupa surrounded by a circular colonnade and an enclosing wall. It was built during the time of Ashoka in the 3rd century BCE, and near it were found two of Ashoka's Minor Rock Edicts, the Bairat and the Calcutta-Bairat Minor Rock Edicts. The temple is an important marker of the architecture of India.

A rare circular stand-alone temple
Early Chaitya halls are known from the 3rd century BCE. They generally followed a circular or apsidal plan, and were either rock-cut or freestanding. Temples —built on elliptical, circular, quadrilateral, or apsidal plans— were initially constructed using brick and timber. Some temples of timber with wattle-and-daub may have preceded them, but none remain to this day.

Today, only the foundation of the temple remains. The circular temple was located inside a rectangular enclosure wall, and had an outer diameter of 5.6 meters. It was built around a small stupa at the centre, with a diameter of 1.6 meters. There was also an internal circle of 26 wooden octagonal columns surrounding the stupa. The layout created two pradaksina circular paths for devotional deambulation. The global shape of the temple has been inferred from more or less contemporary reliefs of such buildings from Bharhut, or from rock-cut temples at Kondivite, Tulja Caves or Guntupalli Caves.

It has been suggested that this circular design with columns was derived from the similar design of the Greek Tholos. However local circular hut designs are a more probable source of inspiration.

Minor Rock Edict of Ashoka

A Minor Rock Edict of Ashoka (the unique Minor Rock Edict No.3) was found in close proximity to the Temple: the Bairat-Calcutta Edict, also called the Bhabru Edict, from the name of a nearby village. Dating to circa 250 BCE, the edict was found just in front of the remains of the Bairat Temple, on the lower platform located between the temple and the cannon-shaped large rock, by Major Burt in 1840. The presence of this inscription, its date and its Buddhist content, help date the temple with a high level of certainty, as well as confirm its Buddhist affiliation.

The Edict, relocated since the 19th century to the Asiatic Society of Bengal in Calcutta (hence the name "Calcutta-Bairat Edict)", is the only one of its kind, describing Buddhist scriptures recommended by Ashoka for study. It reads:

This edict was the basis for the efforts at deciphering Brahmi, led by James Prinsep in 1837. A commemorative plaque is visible at the Asiatic Society.

Other circular temples

Some of the earliest free-standing temples may have been of a circular type. Ashoka also built the Mahabodhi Temple in Bodh Gaya circa 250 BCE, also a circular structure, in order to protect the Bodhi tree under which the Buddha had found enlightenment. Representations of this early temple structure are found on a 100 BCE relief sculpted on the railing of the stupa at Bhārhut, as well as in Sanchi. From that period the Diamond throne remains, an almost intact slab of sandstone decorated with reliefs, which Ashoka had established at the foot of the Bodhi tree. These circular-type temples were also found in later rock-hewn caves such as Tulja Caves or Guntupalli.

Apsidal temples
Another early free-standing temple in India, this time apsidal in shape, appears to be Temple 40 at Sanchi, which is also dated to the 3rd century BCE. It was an apsidal temple built of timber on top of a high rectangular stone platform, 26.52x14x3.35 metres, with two flights of stairs to the east and the west. The temple was burnt down sometime in the 2nd century BCE. This type of apsidal structure was also adopted for most of the cave temple (Chaitya-grihas), as in the 3rd century BCE Barabar Caves and most caves thereafter, with side, and then frontal, entrances. A freestanding apsidal temple remains to this day, although in a modified form, in the Trivikrama Temple in Ter, Maharashtra.

See also

 ASI notice

References

Sources
 Chandra, Pramod (2008), South Asian arts, Encyclopædia Britannica.

Buddhist sites in India
Edicts of Ashoka
Buddhism in Rajasthan